Islam Amirkhanovich Mashukov (born 22 February 1995) is a Russian football player. He plays for FC Alania Vladikavkaz.

Club career
He made his debut in the Russian Football National League for FC Alania Vladikavkaz on 5 September 2013 in a game against FC Mordovia Saransk.

Personal life
He is an identical twin brother of Khachim Mashukov.

References

External links
 

1995 births
Sportspeople from Nalchik
Living people
Twin sportspeople
Russian footballers
Association football forwards
FC Spartak Vladikavkaz players
FC SKA-Khabarovsk players
FC Dila Gori players
FC Volgar Astrakhan players
FC Orenburg players
FC Khimki players
PFC Spartak Nalchik players
Russian First League players
Russian Second League players
Erovnuli Liga players
Russian expatriate footballers
Expatriate footballers in Georgia (country)
Russian expatriate sportspeople in Georgia (country)